United Communist Party of India (UCPI), is a political party in India.  It was formed in 1989 when Indian Communist Party led by Com. Mohit Sen along with Com Ramesh Sinha, M. Kalyanasundaram, K.Manickam, D. Pandian, and SU. Palanisamy; All India Communist Party led by S.A. Dange and Roza Deshpande; and Communist Party of Punjab led Com. Wadhawa Ram and Sukhinder Singh Dhaliwal; decided to merge their formations and called for national conference of communists.

The founding conference was held at Salem, Tamil Nadu in May 1989.  Delegates from Tamil Nadu, Andhra Pradesh, W. Bengal, Orissa, Assam, Bihar, Uttar Pradesh, Delhi, Himachal Pradesh, Punjab, Maharashtra, Goa and Kerala met and declared the formation of United Communist Party of India.  S.A Dange and Mohit Sen were elected Chairman and General-secretary respectively of the newly formed central committee. S.A.Dange, Mohit Sen, Ramesh Sinha, Roza Deshpande, D. Pandian, K.M. Sundram, Sukhinder Singh, K.Manickam, Keshav Sachan and Shyam Narain Tiwari were elected as Political Committee members. Veteran communist leader Mohit Sen was the general secretary of the party until his death in 2003.

UCPI participates in the Confederation of Indian Communists and Democratic Socialists.

Leaders

Founding Leaders
 Late S.A. Dange, the founding leader of CPI S.A. Dange
 Late Mohit Sen, the founder of erstwhile Indian Communist Party
 M. Kalyanasundaram
 K.Manickam
 D. Pandian
 Roza Deshpande, the daughter of S.A. Dange
 Late Bani Deshpande, the son-in-law of S.A. Dange
 Late Varghese Vaidyan, a senior founding leader from Kerala.
 Ramesh Sinha
 Wadhawa Ram
 S.U. Palanisamy
 Dev Kumar Yadav
 K.M. Sundram
 Keshav Sachan
 Shyam Narain Tiwari
 Sukhinder Singh Dhaliwal

Present Leadership
 President: G.V. Narayana Rao
 General Secretary: Sukhinder Singh Dhaliwal
 Political Committee Members: P.K. Pattabi Raman, M. Sunder Rajan, Charan Gill, Hargopal Singh, S.V. Sant, Shiv Dutt Chaturvedi, Sarabjit Kumar and Professor Mihir Sinha

States Leadership
Tamil Nadu
President : P.K. Pattabiraman
 M. Sundarajan Secretary :  
Secretariat Members : M.P. Shankar, R. Sundaramurthy , S.Mani, Kathirkaamam, G.Ganesan, S.Sundaram, M.S. Ramasamy reddy, S. Selvaraj

Punjab
President—Baljit Singh Bhullar
Secretary—Charan Gill
Cashier—Dharam Pal Sethi
Secretariat members—Gurcharan Dhaliwal, Raghbir Singh, Harnam singh, Nirmal Singh Brar, Hardeep Singh, Gurmeet Singh, Amrik Singh, Harbans Singh, Balbir Singh Dhillon, Ranjit Singh, Karam Singh Brar and Pratap.

1992 Punjab assembly elections
UCPI contested two seats of Malout and Abohar. Its candidate Com. Baldev Singh Ballamgarh was elected from Malout constituency while Abohar candidate Bhag Singh Chug lost.

Kerala
Secretary: Comrade Prem Medayil
United Communist Party of India has started in Kerala under the leadership of Com. Prem Medayil
Acting President is Com. Mundur Murali.
Secretariate Members: Ajithkumar Eravath (Kozhikode), Sreejith (Thiruvananthapuram), Sathish (Alappuzha), Fazal (Alappuzha),Baby Joseph (Idukki), Noby Augustine(Ernakulam), Joicy (Thrissur), Muhammad (Palakkad), Junish Babu (Kozhikode), Noushad (Malappuram) Omana(Kollam), Sydney Rolland (Kozhikode)

2007 UP election
In the 2007 assembly election in Uttar Pradesh UCPI launched three candidate, Devi Dayal Yadav in Karki (572 votes, 0.49% of the votes in the constituency), Anand Kumar in Baberu (899 votes, 0.82%) and Vimal Krishan Srivastav in Banda (456 votes, 0.39%).

2000 Andhra Pradesh Municipal Elections
In 2000 municipal elections of Andhra Pradesh UCPI candidate Mr. Chadalawada Jagannadham have contested for Municipal Corporator for 49th ward with the symbol of congress party (As UCPI has no recognition with EC).Out of total 3500(Approximately) total voters polling percentage was about 65% and Mr. Jagannadham won with a majority of approximately 700 votes over his nearest rival from the TDP party. Five years he have served as Corporation Education and Library Committee Chairman and corporations representative in the committee of Hindu college.

References

Political parties established in 1989
Communist parties in India